Majulan (also Romanized as Mājūlān; also known as Badzhalan, Bājalān, Mājelān, and Mājlān) is a village in Shal Rural District, Shahrud District, Khalkhal County, Ardabil Province, Iran. At the 2006 census, its population was 258, in 74 families.

References 

Towns and villages in Khalkhal County